Fagerhaug or Fagerhaugen is a village in Oppdal municipality in Trøndelag county, Norway. Fagerhaug is located just south of the municipal border with Rennebu. In 1921, Fagerhaug Church was built in the village.

Fagerhaug previously had a train station along the Dovrebanen railway line, but the station is no longer in use.

The Oppdal Airport, Fagerhaug is located on the south side of the village.  It is used by MFL (Midtnorsk Fly- og Luftsportsenter) for various aviation sport activities, such as parachuting and gliding.  This is the home base for NTNU Parachute Club and NTH Soaring Club.

References

External links
Midtnorsk Fly- og Luftsportsenter
NTNU Parachute Club (NTNU Fallskjermklubb)
NTH Soaring Club (NTH Flyklubb)

Villages in Trøndelag
Oppdal